Mathilde Bjerregaard (born 9 August 1993) is a Danish handball player who currently plays for FCM Håndbold.

Honors
Youth Olympic Games:
Winner: 2010

European Women's U-19 Handball Championship:
Winner: 2011

References

External links
 DHDb - Mathilde Bjerregaard 

1993 births
Living people
Danish female handball players
Sportspeople from Aarhus
Handball players at the 2010 Summer Youth Olympics
FCM Håndbold players
Youth Olympic gold medalists for Denmark